Brian Ferrares (born 1 March 2000) is a Uruguayan footballer who plays as centre back for Celta B, on loan from Cerro Largo.

Club career
On 7 October 2020, Ferrares joined Celta B on loan.

Career statistics

Club

References

2000 births
Living people
Footballers from Montevideo
Uruguayan footballers
Uruguay youth international footballers
Danubio F.C. players
Cerro Largo F.C. players
Uruguayan Primera División players
Segunda División B players
Celta de Vigo B players
Expatriate footballers in Spain
Uruguayan expatriate sportspeople in Spain
Association football defenders